The quintal is a historical unit of mass.

Quintal may also refer to:

Surname
 Arthur Quintal I (1795–1873), Pitcairn Islands politician
 Arthur Quintal II (1816–1902), Pitcairn Islands politician
 Edward Quintal (1800–1841), first magistrate of the British Overseas Territory of Pitcairn Island, son of Matthew Quintal
 Jason Quintal (born 1987), Australian badminton player
 John Quintal (1884–1961), Australian politician
 Mary Quintal (born 1929), Singaporean badminton player, first female police inspector in Singapore and an Assistant Superintendent of Police from 1961 to 1974
 Matthew Quintal (1766–1799), Cornish HMS Bounty mutineer
 Maurice Quintal (born 1947), Canadian airline pilot
 Miquelina Maria Possante Sardinha Quintal (1902–1966), Portuguese anarchist
 Stéphane Quintal (born 1968), Canadian retired ice hockey player

Places
 Quintal, Haute-Savoie, a commune of the Haute-Savoie département in France

See also
 Quartal and quintal harmony
 Antero de Quental (1842–1891), Portuguese poet, philosopher and writer